Advanced Media Broadcasting System (AMBS) is a broadcast media company in the Philippines. Its main offices and facilities are located at Unit 906A of the Paragon Plaza Building and at the 3rd Floor of Starmalls EDSA Shaw complex, both in Mandaluyong City, Metro Manila.

Founded in 1994 by the Vera family, it is owned by the Villar Group-backed Prime Asset Ventures through Planet Cable.

History

Early years
The Vera family, under the aegis of Quest Broadcasting head, attorney Jose Luis Vera, established Advanced Media Broadcasting System in 1994 with its Congressional franchise granted the following year. With the help of Jinji Buhain (niece of then-Manila Auxiliary Bishop Teodoro Buhain), AMBS bought 103.5 DWCS from the Archdiocese of Manila and changed its callsign to DWKX which gave the birth of adult contemporary station K-Lite. The station, along with four other Vera-controlled Metro Manila stations - (Jam 88.3, Wave 89.1, Magic 89.9 and 99.5 RT) and the Killerbee provincial network - formed The Radio Partners in the early 2000s before being reorganized in 2011 under the new Tiger 22 Media group.

Under Villar ownership
In 2019, AMBS was granted a 25-year legislative franchise extension under Republic Act No. 11253, albeit without President Rodrigo Duterte's signature as the bill lapsed into law after 30 days of inaction. The Vera family and AMBS president Andrew Santiago, however, decided to sell the company to Planet Cable of real estate magnate and businessman-politician Manny Villar after its FM station (K-Lite) was in the red due the effects of the COVID-19 pandemic.

On January 5, 2022, the National Telecommunications Commission (NTC) awarded AMBS a provisional authority to operate for the digital Channel 16 frequency (previously assigned to ABS-CBN Corporation) for an 18-month test broadcast period; and for the analog Channel 2 frequency under a temporary assignment for simulcast purposes until analog shut-off in 2023. The construction of AMBS's own digital terrestrial television network in Metro Manila was expected to be completed in July 2022.

In June 2022, AMBS Manila began its test broadcast. On September 1, 2022, TV Host Willie Revillame announced that the TV station of AMBS will be named as ALLTV. Initially targeted on October 1, 2022, ALLTV made its soft launch on September 13, 2022 at 12 pm PHT, with plans of expanding it nationwide by the end of the year or even sooner; the grand launch will take place in early 2023. On July 15, 2022, during his contract signing with AMBS, Revillame announced that his variety show Wowowin would return on All TV since its final broadcast on GMA Network on February 11, 2022.

Stations

Radio

Television
Analog (shutoff by 2023)

Digital

All TV Manila conducted a test broadcast in Metro Manila from June 27 to September 12, 2022. The station began its broadcast through soft launch on September 13, 2022.

Pay TV

Notes

References

Philippine radio networks
Mass media companies of the Philippines
Mass media companies established in 1994
1994 establishments in the Philippines
Companies based in Mandaluyong
Television networks in the Philippines
Philippine companies established in 1994
Privately held companies of the Philippines